Steve Thornton (born March 8, 1973) is a Canadian-born British former professional ice hockey player. He is currently the Director of Hockey Operations for the Belfast Giants of the Elite Ice Hockey League.

Career 
Thornton was born in Gloucester, Ontario. Apart from playing junior hockey with the Gloucester Rangers, college hockey with Boston University and one season in the International Hockey League with the Peoria Rivermen, Thornton's career has been played in Europe.  He has single season spells in Austria with Klagenfurt and in Germany's Deutsche Eishockey Liga with the Adler Mannheim before moving to the United Kingdom, spending five seasons with the Cardiff Devils.  He also had spells with the London Knights and the Belfast Giants where he won the playoff cup in 2003.  He then moved to Italy, spending two seasons with Val Pusteria Wolves and then had spells in Switzerland and Sweden before returning to Britain, joined the Basingstoke Bison.

Coaching career 
On April 7, 2008, Thornton was confirmed as the new player/coach of the Belfast Giants, replacing Ed Courtenay and in two seasons in charge he guided the Giants to three trophies.  He departed in 2010 and was replaced by Doug Christiansen.

On Monday 28 April 2014, Thornton returned as coach of the Belfast Giants, under taking the wider role of Head of Hockey Operations upon the departure of, Belfast Giants General Manager, Todd Kelman.

Personal
Thornton has acquired British citizenship.

Thornton was formerly a real estate agent with Paul Rushforth Real Estate in Ottawa, Ontario.

References

External links

1973 births
Adler Mannheim players
Basingstoke Bison players
Belfast Giants players
Boston University Terriers men's ice hockey players
Canadian expatriate sportspeople in Italy
Canadian ice hockey centres
Canadian ice hockey coaches
Cardiff Devils players
ECH Chur players
EHC Basel players
Naturalised citizens of the United Kingdom
Genève-Servette HC players
Ice hockey people from Ottawa
EC KAC players
Living people
London Knights (UK) players
Peoria Rivermen (IHL) players
Södertälje SK players
Canadian expatriate ice hockey players in England
Canadian expatriate ice hockey players in Northern Ireland
Canadian expatriate ice hockey players in Wales
Canadian expatriate ice hockey players in Austria
Canadian expatriate ice hockey players in Germany
Canadian expatriate ice hockey players in Switzerland
Canadian expatriate ice hockey players in Sweden
NCAA men's ice hockey national champions
Canadian expatriate ice hockey players in the United States
British ice hockey coaches
Canadian sports executives and administrators
British sports executives and administrators
Ice hockey executives
British expatriate sportspeople in Switzerland
British expatriate sportspeople in Sweden
British expatriate sportspeople in Italy
British expatriate ice hockey people
Naturalised sports competitors
British ice hockey right wingers
Canadian emigrants to the United Kingdom